Kenneth Alexander Mitchell (born November 25, 1974) is a Canadian actor. He is known for his role as Eric Green in the CBS television series Jericho (2006–2008) and for portraying various characters in Star Trek: Discovery (2017–present). In film, he appeared as Ralph Cox in the sports biopic Miracle (2004) and as Joseph Danvers in Captain Marvel (2019).

Career 
In 2004 Mitchell was cast in the film Miracle with Kurt Russell, in the role of hockey player Ralph Cox who was the last player cut from the 1980 Mens Olympic Hockey Team.

Mitchell appeared as Eric Green in the U.S. television drama Jericho, which was cancelled by CBS in May 2007 but was brought back onto the 2007–08 schedule following a fan campaign to save the show.

In 2014, Mitchell was cast in ABC's The Astronaut Wives Club television drama series, playing the role of Deke Slayton. Mitchell played three recurring Klingon characters in Star Trek: Discovery: season 1's Kol and season 2's Kol-Sha (Kol's father) and Tenavik. He also appeared in season 3 as Aurellio, a character whose use of a wheelchair-like device matched Mitchell's real situation with his progressing amyotrophic lateral sclerosis (ALS) disease; Mitchell has hinted that he will be seen in season 4 playing a character who, like Mitchell's progressing situation, has lost the use of his voice. Mitchell was cast in the FX The Old Man by Dan Shotz, a friend of Mitchell's who was also an executive producer on Jericho. The role also incorporated Mitchell's condition into the character.

Personal life 
In May 2006, Mitchell married actress Susan May Pratt. They have two children, a daughter (born 2007) and a son (born 2012).

Health and disability
In February 2020, Mitchell revealed that he was diagnosed with amyotrophic lateral sclerosis (ALS), also known as Lou Gehrig's Disease. He has used a power wheelchair since October 2019. To incorporate Mitchell's wheelchair, the showrunners of Star Trek: Discovery created a character called "Aurellio", a scientist similarly paralyzed by illness, for the season 3 episode "There Is a Tide...". By August 2021, Mitchell had lost the use of his voice due to the disease.

Filmography

References

External links 

Canadian expatriate male actors in the United States
Canadian male television actors
Male actors from Toronto
University of Guelph alumni
1974 births
Living people
People with motor neuron disease